This is a list of notable individuals born in Uruguay of Lebanese ancestry (Lebanese Uruguayans) or people of Lebanese and Uruguayan dual nationality who live or lived in Uruguay.

Arts 
 Malena Muyala - tango singer
 Felipe Seade - painter
 Dahd Sfeir - actress

Politicians
 Alberto Abdala - politician, lawyer, painter, former Vice-President of Uruguay
 Carlos Abdala - politician and diplomat
 Pablo Abdala - politician and lawyer
 Washington Abdala - politician, lawyer, media pundit

Writers
 Amir Hamed - writer and translator

Judges
 Jorge Chediak - member of the Supreme Court

See also
Lebanon–Uruguay relations
List of Lebanese people
List of Lebanese people (Diaspora)

References

Uruguay
Lebanese

 
Lebanese